Zygobaris is a genus of flower weevils in the beetle family Curculionidae. There are about eight described species in Zygobaris.

Species
These eight species belong to the genus Zygobaris:
 Zygobaris centrinoides Green, 1920
 Zygobaris coelestinus Linell & M.L., 1897
 Zygobaris conspersus LeConte & J.L., 1876
 Zygobaris convexus LeConte & J.L., 1876
 Zygobaris nitens LeConte, 1876
 Zygobaris subcalvus LeConte & J.L., 1878
 Zygobaris tristicula Champion & G.C., 1908
 Zygobaris xanthoxyli Pierce & W.D., 1907

References

Further reading

 
 
 

Baridinae
Articles created by Qbugbot